Yarroweyah is a former railway station in Yarroweyah, Victoria, Australia.

Yarroweyah became a no-on-in-charge station in March 1976.

References

Railway stations in Australia opened in 1888
Railway stations closed in 1993
Disused railway stations in Victoria (Australia)